Club Deportivo Unión Mirave is a Peruvian football club, located in the city of Ilabaya, Tacna, Peru.

History
Unión Mirave was founded in 1977. The club is one of the most popular teams of Tacna with the Coronel Bolognesi, Unión Alfonso Ugarte and Mariscal Miller.

In 2010 Copa Perú, the club classified to Regional Stage, but was eliminated by FBC Aurora in the semifinals.

Rivalries
Unión Mirave has had a long-standing rivalry with Unión Alfonso Ugarte and Mariscal Miller.

Honours

Regional
Liga Departamental de Tacna:
 Runner-up (1): 2010

Liga Provincial de Jorge Basadre:
Winners (5): 2009, 2010, 2016, 2019, 2022
 Runner-up (3): 2012, 2017, 2018

See also
List of football clubs in Peru
Peruvian football league system

External links
Union Mirave a la Liguilla Final
RSSSF - Copa Peru 2010

Football clubs in Peru
Association football clubs established in 1977
1977 establishments in Peru